Stagmomantis floridensis, common name larger Florida mantis, is a species of praying mantis in the family Mantidae.  They are native to the south-eastern United States.

References

Mantidae
Mantodea of North America
Insects of the United States
Fauna of the Southeastern United States
Insects described in 1919